Tharaka Samaratunga (born 14 September 1978) is a Sri Lankan former cricketer. He played in 17 first-class and 15 List A matches between 1998/99 and 2005/06. He made his Twenty20 debut on 17 August 2004, for Kurunegala Youth Cricket Club in the 2004 SLC Twenty20 Tournament. Following his playing career he became a coach, working with the International Cricket Council (ICC) on coaching courses in Dubai.

References

External links
 

1978 births
Living people
Sri Lankan cricketers
Chilaw Marians Cricket Club cricketers
Colts Cricket Club cricketers
Kurunegala Youth Cricket Club cricketers
Place of birth missing (living people)